Meshal Abdullah (born 2 May 1984) is a Qatari footballer. He currently plays as a striker former plays Qatar national football team.

External links
 Goalzz.com profile

Qatari footballers
1984 births
Living people
Al-Sailiya SC players
Al Ahli SC (Doha) players
Qatar international footballers
Al-Gharafa SC players
Qatar SC players
Al-Wakrah SC players
2015 AFC Asian Cup players
Association football forwards
Qatar Stars League players
Qatari Second Division players